Moeschleria is a genus of moths of the Bombycidae family. It contains the single species Moeschleria hulstii, which is found in Puerto Rico.

References

 

Bombycidae